Paranavaí is a municipality in the state of Paraná in Brazil that was founded on December 14, 1952. Paranavaí is located in a rich Northwest part of the state of Paraná and has a population of 88,922 (IBGE, 2020). It constitutes a medium regional centre whose main activities include commerce, services, and agro-industries (cassava flour, chicken, orange). In addition, Paranavaí has some higher education institutions, which include the State College of Education, Science and Letters (FAFIPA-Unespar). Paranavaí is also known for its only professional soccer team, the Atlético Clube Paranavaí - ACP (Paraná State Championship runner-up in 2003 and champion in 2007), and for the Music and Poetry Festival, held every year, which attracts artistic talents from all parts of Brazil.

Paranavaí is served by Edu Chaves Airport.

Notable people
Miranda Football player

References

 
Populated places established in 1952
1952 establishments in Brazil